The Secret is 1992 American made-for-television drama film starring Kirk Douglas and Jesse R. Tendler about a grandfather and his grandson who both struggle with dyslexia. The film originally aired on CBS on April 19, 1992.

Plot
Filmed in Nova Scotia, the film stars Kirk Douglas as the owner of a store who has difficulty with reading and writing, a fact which he hides from everyone. This changes when he realizes his grandson, Danny (Jesse R. Tendler) has  the same difficulties.

Awards
Nominated: Young Artist Award: Best Young Actor in a film made for television

See also
List of artistic depictions of dyslexia

References

External links

 
A Cold-War Couple With a Couple of Peculiarities  (scroll down)

1992 television films
1992 films
1992 drama films
Dyslexia in fiction
Films shot in Nova Scotia
CBS network films
Films directed by Karen Arthur
Films scored by Fred Karlin
American drama television films
1990s English-language films
1990s American films